Ethel Mary (E. M.) Granger Bennett (died April 19, 1988) was a Canadian writer, best known for her Ryerson Fiction Award-winning novel Short of the Glory.

Biography
Born in England as Ethel Mary Granger, she was raised in Collingwood, Ontario. After completing high school, she spent several years teaching in a small two-room elementary school near Collingwood, and writing for the local newspaper, to save money to attend the University of Toronto. She graduated from the university's Victoria College in 1915 with a degree in modern languages. After World War I, she married academic Harold Bennett, who would later go on to become president of Victoria College and Laurentian University.

Bennett taught languages, including French and German, at various institutions including the University of Toronto and the Ontario Ladies' College. She earned her Ph.D. from the University of Wisconsin–Madison in 1931.

She published three historical fiction novels: Land for Their Inheritance (1955), A Straw in the Wind (1958) and Short of the Glory (1960). All three novels dealt with the settlement and development of New France.

Later in life, she took a doctorate in sacred literature from Victoria College.

She died on April 19, 1988 in Toronto, Ontario, at age 96 according to The Globe and Mail or 97 according to the Toronto Star.

References

1988 deaths
Canadian women novelists
20th-century Canadian novelists
Writers from Ontario
Canadian historical novelists
University of Toronto alumni
University of Wisconsin–Madison alumni
People from Collingwood, Ontario
English emigrants to Canada
Place of birth missing
Year of birth missing
20th-century Canadian women writers
Women historical novelists